"Down 4 U" is the lead single from Murder Inc. Records' compilation album Irv Gotti Presents: The Inc. The song features rapped verses from Ja Rule, Charli Baltimore, and Vita while Ashanti provides the chorus and sung vocals. The song is a remix as well as its music video being the sequel of Ja Rule's 2002 single, "Down Ass Bitch".

Background
"Down 4 U" became a hit on the US Billboard charts during mid-2002, reaching number six on the Hot 100 chart on the week of August 17, 2002, and number three on both the R&B and rap charts. The Irv Gotti-produced song interpolates Roger Troutman's 1987 hit, "I Want to Be Your Man", for which he and his brother Larry Troutman were given writing credits. The associated music video showed the artists performing the song on a beach with cameos by Irv Gotti, Eric Roberts, Clarence Williams III, Bobby Brown, Whitney Houston and other members of the Inc.

In addition to appearing on Irv Gotti Presents: The Inc., the song also appeared on The Source magazine's compilation The Source Presents: Hip Hop Hits, Vol. 6 and as a bonus track on Ja Rule's 2002 album, The Last Temptation. The song was performed live by Ja Rule and Ashanti at VH1's 6th Annual Hip Hop Honors that honored Def Jam Recordings.

Track listings

US promo CD
 "Down 4 U" (top 40 edit)
 "Down 4 U" (radio edit)
 "Down 4 U" (instrumental)
 "Down 4 U" (call out research hook)

UK 12-inch single
A1. "Down 4 U" (radio edit) – 5:16
A2. "Down 4 U" (D'n'D vocal mix) – 5:30
B1. "Down 4 U" (D'n'D Conemelt mix) – 5:47

UK CD single
 "Down 4 U" (radio edit) – 5:16
 "Down 4 U" (D'n'D vocal mix) – 5:30
 "Down 4 U" (D'n'D Conemelt mix) – 5:47
 "Down 4 U" (video)

UK cassette single
 "Down 4 U" (radio edit)
 "Down 4 U" (D'n'D vocal mix)

Credits and personnel
Credits are adapted from the UK CD single liner notes.

Studios
 Recorded at the Crackhouse (New York City)
 Mixed at Right Track Studios (New York City)
 Mastered at Sony Music Studios (London, England)

Personnel

 Jeffrey Atkins – writing
 Irving Lorenzo – writing
 Ashanti Douglas – writing
 Tiffany Lane – writing
 L. Rayner – writing
 Larry Troutman – writing ("I Want to Be Your Man")

 Roger Troutman – writing ("I Want to Be Your Man")
 Irv Gotti – writing (as Irving Lorenzo), production
 7 Aurelius – writing, production
 Milwaukee Buck – recording, mixing
 Terry "Murda Mac" Herbert – recording assistant
 Naweed "Dirty" Ahmed – mastering engineer

Charts

Weekly charts

Year-end charts

Release history

References

2001 songs
2002 singles
Ashanti (singer) songs
Def Jam Recordings singles
Ja Rule songs
Songs written by Ashanti (singer)
Songs written by Channel 7 (musician)
Songs written by Irv Gotti
Songs written by Ja Rule
Songs written by Larry Troutman
Songs written by Roger Troutman